Drupadia is a butterfly genus in the family Lycaenidae. They are commonly known as posies. The members (species) of this genus are found in the Indomalayan realm.

Species
Drupadia cinderella Cowan, 1974
Drupadia cindi Cowan, 1974
Drupadia cineas (Grose-Smith, 1889)
Drupadia cinesia (Hewitson, 1863)
Drupadia cinesoides (de Nicéville, 1889)
Drupadia estella (Hewitson, 1863)
Drupadia hayashii Schroeder & Treadaway, 1989
Drupadia johorensis (Cowan, 1958)
Drupadia niasica (Röber, 1886)
Drupadia ravindra (Horsfield, [1829])
Drupadia rufotaenia (Fruhstorfer, 1912)
Drupadia scaeva (Hewitson, 1863)
Drupadia theda (C. & R. Felder, 1862)

References
 , 2004: A contribution to the butterfly fauna of the Island of Balambangan (Malaysia, Sabah) (Insecta: Lepidoptera). Futao 47: 6-13.
, 1974. The Indo-Oriental genus Drupadia Moore (Lepidoptera: Lycaenidae) Bull. Br. Mus. nat. Hist. (Ent) 29(6): 281-356, 6 pls, 15 figs.
, 1882-1886. Rhopalocera Malayana. 16 + 481 pp., 41 pls. London.
, 1816 - 1826. Verz. bekannt. Schmett. Augsberg. 
, 1884. Descriptions of some new Asiatic diurnal lepidoptera; chiefly from Specimens contained in the Indian Museum, Calcutta. J. asiat. Soc. Bengal, Pt II, 53(1):16-52.
, 1890.  The butterflies of India, Burmah & Ceylon. 3. Calcutta, xi + 503 pp. Text, Plates.
, 1918. The Rhopalocera of Java] Part 4. (Erycinidae: Lycaenidae), xlv + 112 pp., 9 pls. The Hague.
 , 2012: Revised checklist of the butterflies of the Philippine Islands (Lepidoptera: Rhopalocera). Nachr. entomol. Ver. Apollo, Suppl. 20: 1-64.

External links

Funet Taxonomy Distribution Images

 
Lycaenidae genera
Taxa named by Frederic Moore